GGS or GGs may refer to:

Education 
 Geelong Grammar School, in Victoria, Australia
 Gravesend Grammar School, in Kent, England
 Guildford Grammar School, in Perth, Western Australia

Other uses 
 Generations and Gender Survey
 Gerald Gentleman Station, a power station in Nebraska
 German Geophysical Society
 Germany Guard Service
 Gibson Generating Station, a power station in Indiana
 Girl Geeks Scotland
 Girl Guides Singapore
 Global Geo Services, a Norwegian seismic company
 Global Geospace Science, a NASA program
 Glucosylglycerate synthase
 Gobernador Gregores Airport, in Argentina
 Governor General's Awards, in Canada
 The Great Giana Sisters, a video game
 Guns, Germs, and Steel
 Guru Granth Sahib, the central religious scripture of Sikhism
 Gyro gunsight
 Ottawa Gee-Gees, the University of Ottawa athletic team

See also 
 GG (disambiguation)